Ivan Banari (born November 13, 1955, Coşcodeni) is a Moldovan politician.

Biography 

He served as member of the Parliament of Moldova (2005–2009).

External links 
 Committee on Foreign Policy and European Integration, Committee structure
 Parlamentul Republicii Moldova

References

1955 births
Living people
Moldovan MPs 2005–2009
Electoral Bloc Democratic Moldova MPs